William Pleis III (born August 5, 1937) is a retired American professional baseball player, a left-handed pitcher who appeared in 190 Major League games between  and  for the Minnesota Twins. On April 22, 1961, Pleis notched the Twins' first-ever win in their new home state and home field, Metropolitan Stadium.

In , he equaled his career season-high for saves (four) and won four other games as the Twins captured their first American League pennant and the franchise's first since , when it was located in Washington. He appeared in the 1965 World Series against the Los Angeles Dodgers, a team he would serve as a longtime scout after the end of his playing career. He gave up two hits and an earned run in one inning pitched in Game 4, a game the Dodgers won 7–2 to even the series at two wins each. Los Angeles went on to prevail in seven games.

Pleis retired from pitching after the 1968 season.  He allowed 269 hits and 127 bases on balls in  innings pitched in the Majors, with 184 strikeouts, 13 saves and one complete game.

Personal
Pleis' son, Scott, was selected in the fourth round of the 1981 MLB Draft before transitioning into a scouting career.

References

External links

1937 births
Living people
Allentown Red Sox players
Baseball players from Missouri
Charlotte Hornets (baseball) players
Denver Bears players
Hawaii Islanders players
Houston Astros scouts
Lafayette Oilers players
Los Angeles Dodgers scouts
Louisville Colonels (minor league) players
Magic Valley Cowboys players
Major League Baseball pitchers
Memphis Chickasaws players
Minnesota Twins players
Orlando Seratomas players
People from Kirkwood, Missouri
Syracuse Chiefs players
Vancouver Mounties players